The third season of the serial crime-thriller television series Millennium commenced airing in the United States on October 2, 1998, and concluded on May 21, 1999 after airing twenty-two episodes. It tells the story of retired FBI Agent Frank Black (Lance Henriksen). Black had previously worked for a private investigative organization, the Millennium Group, but left after the Group unleashed a virus that resulted in the death of Black's wife. Now working for the Federal Bureau of Investigation with agent Emma Hollis (Klea Scott), Black seeks to discredit and expose the Group for their sinister motives.

The season saw the introduction of a new lead character in Hollis. Scott faced difficulty in securing the role, as Fox executives had desired a white actress for the part instead; Scott's agent fought for her to be given an audition, which proved successful. The season also brought in two new executive producers—Michael Duggan and Chip Johannessen, who had previously written episodes in earlier seasons. 

Episodes from the third season have seen generally positive reviews from critics, as has the season as a whole. Stars Henriksen and Brittany Tiplady were nominated for several acting awards for their work on the season—a Golden Globe Award nod for Henriksen and two Young Artist Award nominations for Tiplady. In addition, series cinematographer Robert McLachlan was nominated for two American Society of Cinematographers awards during the season. Ultimately none of these nominations proved successful.

Production

When ending the second season, the producers and crew thought it would be the last; Fox executives admitted that the decision to renew the series was "down to the wire". However, to their surprise Millennium was renewed for a third season. Many of the cliffhanger plot threads from the season finale were written off as the hallucinations of Frank Black. When creating the third season, the writers wanted to go back to the standalone storytelling format used in the first season; to do so they had Frank join the FBI and receive a new "skeptical" partner with whom he could work. 

This led to the introduction of Klea Scott as Emma Hollis. Originally, the producers were looking for a white actress to play the part. Scott's agent campaigned for her and guaranteed the series' producers that if she was not considered for the role, he would never send another actor to the casting director of the show. Scott won the role, but producer Chip Johannessen recalled that "she wasn't what the network were looking, they wanted Heather Locklear or something to come. That was kind of how that went down." Fox backed down, and Scott got the role.

The season saw the introduction of Johannessen and Michael Duggan as executive producers; both had previously worked as writers on earlier seasons of the series. The pair worked with series creator Chris Carter, who acknowledged that they had taken heed of past criticism of the series when writing new episodes, wanting to avoid the previous "serial-killer-of-the-week" moniker the show had earned. To this end, the season ended with a seven-episode story arc intended to reduce the series' conflicts down to struggle between two men, rather than larger factions or groups—Black representing the viewer's point of view and Peter Watts (Terry O'Quinn) representing the ideals of the Millennium Group, with both convinced their beliefs are the correct ones and wanting to bring the other to their side. Ultimately, the season did not attract enough viewers, and the series was cancelled by the network.

Cast

Starring
 Lance Henriksen as Frank Black
 Klea Scott as Emma Hollis

Recurring cast

Also starring
 Brittany Tiplady as Jordan Black

Guest starring
 Demetri Goritsas as Agent Dixon
 Terry O'Quinn as Peter Watts
 Peter Outerbridge as Barry Baldwin
Stephen E. Miller as Andy McClaren

Reception

Accolades

The third season earned several awards and nominations for those associated with the series. Henriksen was nominated for a Golden Globe Award for Best Actor in a Television Drama, losing out to Dylan McDermott's portrayal of Bobby Donnell in The Practice. Tiplady was nominated twice for the Young Artist Award for Best Performance in a TV Comedy/Drama – Supporting Young Actress Age Ten or Under; she was beaten out by Scarlett Pomers for Star Trek: Voyager in 1999, and Mae Middleton for Any Day Now in 2000. Cinematographer Robert McLachlan was twice nominated for the American Society of Cinematographers award for Outstanding Achievement in Cinematography in a Regular Series, in 1999 for "Skull and Bones", and in 2000 for "Matryoshka". Both times McLachlan lost the award to Bill Roe, for The X-Files "Drive" in 1999, and "Agua Mala" in 2000.

Critical reception

Writing for Slant magazine, Keith Uhlich gave the season an overall rating of four stars out of five. Uhlich described the season as "a divisive run of episodes that, for many viewers, blasphemously rewrites what came before", but favourably compared it to the fiction works of Jorge Luis Borges. Uhlich felt that the episodes in the season were "challenging" and celebrated the abilities of the individual to forge a life for themselves. DVD Talk's Randy Miller also awarded the season an overall four out of five stars, finding that although its concern about the then-coming millennium made it very much a product of its time, it did not seem to have suffered from this and held up well in retrospect. Miller considered Henriksen's portrayal of Frank Black to have been "masterful"; however, he felt that the retcon of its second season finale alienated viewers and led to its dwindling popularity.

Robert Shearman and Lars Pearson, in their book Wanting to Believe: A Critical Guide to The X-Files, Millennium & The Lone Gunmen, rated several episodes across the season highly, awarding five stars out of five to "Borrowed Time", "Collateral Damage", "Darwin's Eye" and the series finale "Goodbye to All That". However, several episodes also fared poorly in their opinion, including "Closure", "...Thirteen Years Later" and "Forcing the End", all of which the pair rated only one star out of five. Writing for The A.V. Club, Zack Handlen described the season as suffering from several problems, specifically mentioning "its lack of a center, its hamfisted morbidity, the ongoing blahtastrophe that is [Emma Hollis]".

Episodes

Notes

Footnotes

References

External links

 
 

1998 American television seasons
1999 American television seasons